Anthony of Tagrit (also known as Antonius Rhetor) was a 9th-century West Syrian Syriac theologian and rhetor. Anthony was based in Tagrit and is best remembered for his contribution to Syriac literature. One of his few surviving works The Book of the Rhetoric was translated to several languages including English.

References

Syriac writers
People from Tikrit
9th-century writers
Rhetoricians
9th-century Christian theologians
Iraqi Christians